Joseph Clive McCorkell (20 May 1910 – 6 May 1962) was an Australian rules footballer who played with Essendon in the Victorian Football League (VFL).

McCorkell played with Camberwell in 1934 and broke his leg in round three against Sandringham.

Notes

External links 

Clive McCorkell's playing statistics from The VFA Project

1910 births
1962 deaths
Australian rules footballers from Victoria (Australia)
Essendon Football Club players
Colac Football Club players
Camberwell Football Club players